Lucidota atra, the black firefly or woodland lucy, is a diurnal species of firefly — a member of the Lampyridae family of beetles (order Coleoptera).

Range
Lucidota atra are found in eastern North America, excluding Mexico.  Their range extends west to Kansas, Nebraska, Oklahoma and Texas.

Description
This firefly has segmented, conspicuous, black antennae that are serrate. The pronotum extends over the head and is usually red and yellow with a medial black stripe or patch, but may be dark overall in some individuals. The compound eyes are smaller than those of nocturnal species like Photinus pyralis. The elytra are black or brown-black and have granulated texture. The light organ is greatly reduced and difficult to discern in the adult.

Behavior
This is a firefly that flies actively in daylight.  Its flightless larvae live in moist environments, especially decaying wood, and prey on invertebrates with soft bodies, such as snails and slugs.  In eastern Canada, larvae eclose beginning in late May, and adult numbers peak in late June to mid-July.  Male Lucidota atra can identify female mating partners by sensing the female's pheromones with their antennae. Lucidota atra express a characteristic set of odorant receptor genes in their antennae.

References

Further reading

External links

 

Lampyridae
Bioluminescent insects
Articles created by Qbugbot
Beetles described in 1790